Nazenin Ansari is an Iranian journalist, managing editor of Kayhan London, a weekly Persian-language newspaper critical of the current government of Iran (not to be confused with the official Iranian newspaper Kayhan). She is also series producer at the Persian-language entertainment channel Manoto.

She was a London correspondent for Voice of America's Persian News Network until July 2009. She was also president (2007–2009) and vice president (2009–2012) of the Foreign Press Association in London.

Early life 
She received her higher education in the US, with a BA in Public Affairs and Government from George Washington University and an MA in International Relations and Comparative Politics from Georgetown University.

She is a regular panelist on BBC News's Dateline London programme, and provides news analysis about Iran on BBC Radio 4, CNN International, Sky News and Al-Jazeera. She also contributes on the OpenDemocracy website.

Ansari has worked with and been a member of a number of Iranian educational and charitable foundations, including Friends of Persian, the Friends of Persian Language Society, Benefactors of Kahrizak, the Iran Heritage Foundation, the Popli Khalatbari Foundation, the Mihan Foundation, the Persia Educational Foundation and Magic of Persia. She is a member of Chatham House and the International Institute for Strategic Studies, and sits on the Board of Trustees of Encyclopædia Iranica.

Personal life
Ansari was married to the British Iranian billionaire Farhad Moshiri, and they have two children. She lives in London. He lives in Monaco.

References

External links
Kayhan (London) website Retrieved 2010-11-13
Encyclopedia Iranica website Retrieved 2010-11-13
Magic of Persia website. Retrieved 2010-11-13
The Iran Heritage Foundation website. Retrieved 2010-11-13
The Popli Khalatbari Foundation website. Retrieved 2010-11-13

Living people
Chatham House people
Iranian women journalists
George Washington University Graduate School of Education and Human Development alumni
Journalists from London
Georgetown University Graduate School of Arts and Sciences alumni
Year of birth missing (living people)
English people of Iranian descent